Chetumal International Airport  is an international airport located in Chetumal, Quintana Roo, Mexico. It handles national and international air traffic for the city of Chetumal. It's operated by Aeropuertos y Servicios Auxiliares (ASA), a federal government-owned corporation.

Information
The airport joined the ASA Network in 1974, it has 230 hectares and its aircraft platform for commercial aviation is 13.140 meters square, also has two lots and a landing strip with the length of 2.2 km, suitable for Boeing 737 aircraft. The airport has a SENASICA satellite office, and its official business hours are 7:00 to 19:00.

In 2021 the airport handled 279,525 passengers, and in 2022 it handled 374,152 passengers.

Expansion and Renovation
On October 9, 2011, Aeropuertos y Servicios Auxiliares (ASA) invested 19 million pesos (US$1.5 million) in modernizing Chetumal's International Airport by extending landing strips to allow room for more air traffic, as promised by the governor Roberto Borge Angulo. According to the governor the modernization came with the intent of improving the city's infrastructure and logistic developments to make Quintana Roo more competitive within the national market. The modernization of the airport also included the expansion of the main terminal.

Services
The airport has its own parking lot with a reduced capacity of 102 spots
A cafe restaurant operates only in the morning.
There is also taxi and car rental services.

Airlines and destinations

Terminated flights
MexicanaClick formerly served this airport until 2010. Mexicana Click's flight to Chetumal was one of the many flights canceled by the company Mexicana before they filed for bankruptcy in 2010, which led to Mexicana's operations to be ceased on August 3, 2010. In Chetumal, Aeroméxico attempted to take over the services that Mexicana Click offered; however, Interjet's low prices made Aeromexico's service to Chetumal unprofitable. On February 23, 2013, Aeromexico ended its service to Chetumal, but it resumes on December 9, 2020 on Aeromexico Connect.

Aviacsa and VivaAerobus were among the first low-cost airlines that served the airport.

Statistics

Passengers

Accidents and incidents
On January 6, 1972, a Hawker Siddeley HS.748-230 belonging to SAESA (Servicios Aereos Especiales Airlines) crashed shortly after take-off from Chetumal on its way to Mérida, killing 5 crew members and 18 passengers.

References

External links 
 Chetumal International Airport

Airports in Quintana Roo
Chetumal